In the 2010s, the number of LGBTQ characters and storylines about them in Western animation grew. During the decade Allen Gregory, Voltron: Legendary Defender, The Legend of Korra, BoJack Horseman, Steven Universe, Adventure Time, The Loud House, She-Ra and the Princesses of Power, Twelve Forever, The Bravest Knight, Steven Universe, My Little Pony: Friendship is Magic, and OK K.O.! Let's Be Heroes premiered on various platforms. Shows began in the 2000s like 
American Dad!, Archer,  and The Cleveland Show featured LGBTQ characters,  as did South Park which began  in 1997 and The Simpsons which began in 1989. Shows in later years would follow the same pattern. Representation of LGBTQ characters would only continue to grow in the 2020s.

Trends
In 2010, animation and popular culture scholar Jo Johnson argued that the medium of animation itself is being used to "represent prime-time sexuality and gender in a more progressive way than a live-action show." She went onto say that progress made by animated shows has allowed audiences to laugh with, rather than at, queer characters.

In 2014, GLAAD would comment that "children's programming has been slow to reflect the diversity its audience is experiencing in its daily life." In 2015, GLAAD expanded their analysis to include LGBTQ+ characters on stream services like Amazon and Netflix for the first time. In 2016, GLAAD reported that the highest number of LGBTQ characters they had recorded yet appeared in the 2016–2017 television season.

In 2017, GLAAD praised the increase of LGBTQ+ characters on streaming services like Amazon, Netflix, and Hulu. While GLAAD and others were praising the growth in the number of LGBTQ+ characters in broadcast, primetime television, some reported that LGBTQ+ characters in animated television were somewhat rare. From 2017 to 2019, Insider noted that according to their database of LGBTQ characters in children's animations, there was a "more than 200% spike in queer and gender-minority characters in children's animated TV shows."

In 2018, GLAAD noted that while Netflix was featuring more LGBTQ+ people of color, including CW Seed launching two shows with "queer heroes" and how Bojack Horseman expanding the story of Todd, the "only asexual character on streaming originals" as they described it. In 2018 and 2019, GLAAD said that Amazon, Hulu, and Netflix, had increased LGBTQ representation in "daytime kids and family television."

In May 2019, Ashley Fetters and Natalie Escobar argued, in The Atlantic that the episode of Arthur where two male characters got married "marks a poignant moment in children's TV history," and that it feels "unremarkable." They said this is the case because you can "count on your fingers the number of kids’ shows that have depicted gay characters," including Adventure Time, Steven Universe, The Legend of Korra, Gravity Falls, Clarence, and The Loud House.

Animation for adults
The 2010s saw various animated series targeted primarily to adults on FXX, Fox, Comedy Central, Netflix, Adult Swim, and other platforms.

FXX and FOX
In February 2010, Ray Gillette first appeared in the episode "Honeypot" of Archer. He would be an openly gay secret agent, and a former Olympic medalist in skiing.

In May 2010, FOX's Family Guy, introduced Ida Davis, a trans woman, in the episode "Quagmire's Dad." However, she would be criticized for repeating tropes often associated with LGBTQ+ characters. This argument was repeated by other critics in later years. Davis would later become the "butt of many transmisogynistic and transphobic "jokes.""

In the March 2011 episode of Bob's Burgers, a FOX show, titled "Sheesh! Cab, Bob?" various LGBTQ characters would appear. This included a trans female sex worker named Marshmallow, The show would later have other LGBTQ characters like a lesbian limousine driver named Nat Kinkle, whose ex-girlfriend runs an animal sanctuary, and a gay character, Dalton Crespin, who had a boyfriend for a short period of time. Some would also argue that one of the protagonists, Bob Belcher, is a bisexual parent.

From October to December 2011, Allen Gregory, which aired on Fox, had various LGBTQ characters. This included a gay father of the protagonist, Richard De Longpre, and his husband, Jeremy, who previously had a wife and children.

In January 2014, Phillip "Chozen" Cullens, a white, gay, aspiring rap superstar premiered in the FX series, Chozen. He was in a relationship with fratboy-type Hunter, with their relationship developing throughout the series.

On April 3, 2016, in The Simpsons episode of "The Burns Cage", Waylon Smithers came out, officially, as gay. Although some called the episode disappointing, or critical of Smithers as a form of gay representation, others cited it as an example of how LGBTQ+ characters in television had become more accepted. In November 2016, in another Simpsons episode, RuPaul gave Homer Simpson a drag makeover.

In November 2016, some news media outlets teased that Meg Griffin, a protagonist in Family Guy, was about to come out as lesbian. This was never shown in any episodes.

In January 2019, Family Guy! committed to phasing out jokes about the LGBTQ community. During the Family Guy episode "Trump Guy" which premiered on January 13, 2019, Peter Griffin, was seen telling a cartoon President Trump that the show was trying to "phase out" gay jokes. The change in direction was confirmed by the show's executive producers Alec Sulkin and Rich Appel, along with creator Seth MacFarlane, who stated that they wanted to better reflect the current climate in the show due to societal changes which have seen the jokes become frowned upon over time. In the Season 18 episode "Disney's The Reboot" which premiered on October 20, 2019, when asked "I thought I read you guys were phasing out gay jokes?" Peter Griffin replies: "That quote was taken out of context and widely misunderstood.”

Comedy Central
On April 25, 2010, The Drawn Together Movie: The Movie!, an adult animated comedy film was released. It would feature three LGBTQ characters: Captain Leslie Hero, Foxxy Love, and Xandir P. Whifflebottom who had appeared in the original Drawn Together animated series, which aired on Comedy Central from October 2004 to November 2007.

In July 2010, the Futurama episode, "Proposition Infinity" would air on Comedy Central. This episode would speak directly toward Proposition 8. It would later be described as evidence of Futurama'''s "political and social commitment to its LGBT fans," along with the 2003 episode "Bend Her".

In September 2012, Brickleberry, premiered on Comedy Central. The show would introduce a character named Constance Beatrice "Connie" Cunaman. She is a lesbian park ranger who challenged the homophobia of her parents and was obsessed with Ethel. The show's creators confirmed this assessment in an interview.

In October 2015, in the South Park episode, "Tweek x Craig", Craig Tucker and Tweek Tweak were confirmed as a gay couple.

Bojack Horseman, Big Mouth, and Super DragsBojack Horseman, airing from 2014 to 2020 on Netflix, featured a number of LGBTQ+ characters. For instance, Hollyhock, a female teenage horse and Bojack's sister, has eight adoptive fathers (Dashawn Manheim, Steve Mannheim, Jose Guerrero, Cupe Robinson III, Otto Zilberschlag, Arturo "Ice Man" Fonzerelli, Gregory Hsung, and Quackers McQuack) in a polyamorous gay relationship. Todd Chavez in the season 3 finale, "That Went Well," Todd confides in his friend Emily that he doesn't think he is either straight or gay, and in fact "might be nothing". He explores the identity further in season 4 and accepts his asexuality, while meeting others who share his orientation.

In October 2018, a protagonist in Big Mouth, Jay Bilzerian, came out as bisexual. The same year, Ali, a pansexual character, was introduced. Some criticized Ali's character as an oversimplification of the "relationship between private parts and gender identity," even as her existence was praised as putting the show ahead of "most television representations of sexual expression." While some praised the show has talking "honestly about sexuality, puberty, and desire for all genders" they also criticized the show for misrepresenting pansexuality.

In November 2018, Super Drags, a Brazilian show, was added to Netflix. The show focuses on Donizete, Patrick, and Ralph, three gay friends working in a department store, who are also drag queen superheroes, named Scarlet Carmesim, Lemon Chifon, and Safira Cyan are the Super Drags, and are responsible for protecting the LGBTQ community.

Adult Swim
In June 2010, Mary Shelley's Frankenhole aired on Adult Swim featuring an openly gay character Professor Sanguinaire Polidori.

In June 2014, Adult Swim aired an episode of The Boondocks, featuring a number of gay characters like Gangstalicious, a closet homosexual who goes to great lengths to keep his identity as a gay man hidden from the public.

Marquess of Queensbury, appeared on Mike Tyson Mysteries, which started on October 27, 2014. Eric Thurm of The A.V. Club argued that Marquess was a gay character and he was based on a man named John Douglas, the 9th Marquess of Queensberry.

In July 2015, Justin Roiland, one of the show's creators and executive producers off Rick and Morty, which aired on Adult Swim, confirmed that Rick Sanchez is pansexual. This was shown in "Auto Erotic Assimilation", when Rick connects with Unity, an ex-lover who is a collective hive mind of assimilated individuals from the planet they occupy. Throughout the series, Rick's sexuality has also been alluded to, mostly in his backstory.

In the August 15, 2015 Rick and Morty episode "Total Rickall", Sleepy Gary is one of the dozens of aliens that alter the memories of Rick, Morty, Beth and Summer in order to pose as friends and family members. Because of the fake memories, Beth believes herself to be married with Sleepy Gary, and Jerry believes he is having a secret affair with him.

On August 19, 2019, Final Space, which had begun broadcasting on Adult Swim earlier that summer, included representation of its own. In the August 19 episode, "The Closer You Get," Tribore tells Shannon that "he is in love with his other half" because his species flips gender twice a year. One reviewer calls this an amazing non-binary bit of the episode.

Other adult animations
The November 28, 2016 episode of Bee and PuppyCat, entitled "Toast," introduced Toast, a wrestler who formerly wrestled with Cass and holds a grudge against her. In this debut episode for Toast, she mentions her unnamed ex-wife, implying she is a lesbian.

In March 2017, it was confirmed that characters on SuperMansion Black Saturn and The Groaner were bisexual, after being seen in relationships with various women and ultimately married to one another in the future. There are allusions to this Will They/Won't They relationship throughout seasons one through three and then canonically hooking up in the Halloween 2017 special 'Drag Me to Halloween'.  As Black Saturn and The Groaner are parodies of DC characters Batman and the Joker respectively, this representation explores this long-held fan paring.

From December 2017 to July 2018, Freedom Fighters: The Ray aired on CW Seed. The show would feature a gay superhero, Ray, and his gay friend, John. In an early episode, Ray would fail to ask a man on a date, and would struggle in coming out to conservative parents, and in a later episode, Jacob would become his lover.

Young adult animation
The 2010s saw various young adult animated series on Rooster Teeth, YouTube, and Netflix.

Rooster Teeth
On October 2, 2016, Shannon McCormick, who voiced Agent Washington in Red vs. Blue, confirmed that Agent Ohio  and "Vera" and Sherry were a lesbian couple in the show.

In a December 2017 RWBY episode, "Alone Together," Ilia Amitola confessed her feelings for Blake, her former-current-best friend, with Blake the best friend of Yang Xiao Long, her fellow teammate. Amitola was confirmed as a lesbian in a 2018 Reddit AMA by Miles Luna, a showrunner.

A series on Amazon Prime Video, Pete the Cat featured Syd and Sam, who first appeared in December 2017 in the New Years' special, as Sally Squirrel's fathers. They are voiced by gay actors Jim Parsons and Jesse Tyler Ferguson.

In December 2018, the seventh episode of the RWBY's Volume 6, premiered. It featured a lesbian couple:Saphron and Terra Cotta-Arc, who have a son named Adrian.Nomad of Nowhere, released from March to September 2018, featured a lesbian protagonist named Skout, who had a crush on Captain Toth, her superior. This crush has been officially confirmed. In the show, Skout often tries to inspire confidence in her superior, she is often the voice of reason for Toth, who is a rule-oriented and may like Skout too, even though she is occasionally dismissive, causing fissures in their relationship.

In February 2019, in the fourth episode of  gen:LOCK, Val/entina Romanyszyn reveals they were genderfluid. The creators of the show originally approached Tatiana Maslany to voice the part, because she voiced lesbian and trans characters in Orphan Black. However, Maslany told them that "trans actors should play trans parts." Due to her decision and encouragement to look for trans actors, leading Rooster Teeth to bring in Asia Kate Dillon instead, to voice Val.

YouTube and independent animations
In January 2013, Plum, a bisexual character voiced by Tara Strong, would first appear in the animated show, Bravest Warriors, a show which aired on Cartoon Hangover's YouTube channel. The show was made by Adventure Time creator Pendleton Ward and featuring Ian Jones-Quartey, who voiced the character, Wallow, while he directed his own show, OK K.O.! Let's Be Heroes which featured multiple LGBTQ+ characters. Although Plum had a crush on Chris, kissing him multiple times during the show, she is also madly in love with her doppelganger as shown in the comics and kisses Peach in another comic. Furthermore, on numerous occasions, she has identified as bisexual, confirmed by Kate Leth, who wrote all three volumes of the Bravest Warriors comic, writing "Plum is bi and it's canon and I'm proud of her." Wallow, one of the series protagonists, would be described as being loved by aliens, and preferring aliens "over other humans," meaning he could be xenosexual. In August 2014, Breehn Burns, director of seasons 1 and 2 of Bravest Warriors, said that "Wallow wishes he could love everyone equally," but that in the third season of the show, he "finds out how strong his feelings can be."

On September 25, 2019, an episode of Nico Colaleo's animated web series, Too Loud, was posted on YouTube. In the episode, "Slumber Party Sneak-In," Desiree plots with her sister, Sara, to dress up as a girl in order to go to a slumber party. The rest of the girls find this out, the console her, accepting, and deciding they like her no matter whether she is a trans girl named Desiree or as a closeted boy. Colaleo later called the episode important, described it as his favorite episode of the show's second season, and a "pro-transgender episode."

In October 2019, Vivienne "VivziePop" Medrano released an animated production with LGBTQ+ characters. The first of these productions was Hazbin Hotel which introduced a gay pornstar named Angel Dust, a bisexual character named Charlie, a lesbian character named Vaggie, and an asexual character named Alastor. On November 25, the pilot episode of Helluva Boss, set in the same universe as Hazbin Hotel was released on YouTube.  The series would begin its first season in October 2020. It would also feature various LGBTQ characters.

On November 6, 2019, Colaleo, the creator of Ollie and Scoops confirmed two of the characters, Molly and Rachael, to be a lesbian couple.

Netflix

In June 2018, The Hollow, began airing on Netflix, and would continue airing until its end in May 2020. It would feature various LGBTQ characters, who appeared in season 2.

In July 2019, Twelve Forever premiered on Netflix. Most prominent was Reggie Abbott, the protagonist. She has a crush on Conelly, a 13-year-old schoolmate with whom she shares the same taste in imagining and creating stories, as shown in the two-part episode, "Locked Out Forever." Due to the show's abrupt ending, Shadi Petosky, one of the executive producers, stated they won't be able to further explore that aspect of the character/relationship. Also, the show featured Galaxander, a fellow inhabitant of Endless Island, who has an ex-boyfriend, and a male couple, Mack and Beefhouse, who also live on Endless Island.

On July 12, 2019, an episode of 3Below: Tales of Arcadia, titled "Asteroid Rage," included a lesbian kiss between two characters, Shannon Longhannon and Connie.

All-ages animation
The 2010s saw the premiere of all-ages animated series on Cartoon Network, Nickelodeon, Disney Channel, Discovery Family, Netflix, and other platforms with LGBTQ characters.

Cartoon Network

On April 5, 2010, Adventure Time began airing on Cartoon Network. The show introduced viewers to two queer characters: Marceline the Vampire Queen and Princess Bubblegum, with Rebecca Sugar trying to foster the relationship between these two characters through her work on the show, which also featured one genderfluid character (BMO). Sugar would face pushback for years from the Cartoon Network Studio for having Marceline the Vampire Queen and Princess Bubblegum in Adventure Time together, as the studio was concerned about "distribution in countries where being gay or lesbian was censored in media and considered a crime."

In 2011, Young Justice writer, Greg Weisman, confirmed two LGBTQ+ characters in the series: Marie Logan (lesbian or bisexual) and Kaldur'ahm  (polysexual). The show aired on Cartoon Network from 2010 to 2013, on DC Universe in 2019, and the fourth season will be on HBO Max.

On September 26, 2011, Adventure Time began hinting at romantic subtext between two characters, Marcy and Bonnie, called "Bubbline" by fans, with the airing of the episode "What Was Missing".

In November 2013, Steven Universe began airing on Cartoon Network. The show would focus on a half-alien, half-Gem child named Steven Universe, who is raised by three non-binary space aliens: Pearl, Garnet (a fusion of Ruby and Sapphire), and Amethyst, which are female-presenting, using she/her pronouns, in a non-traditional family, with a Steven's father, Greg, living in a van and running a car wash.

In September 2014, Spencer Rothbell, a writer, head of storywriting, for the show Clarence said that they had to change a scene in the episode "Neighborhood Grill", which showed two gay characters after pushback from Cartoon Network executives.

While Rebecca Sugar had received direct notes about LGBTQ characters in her show, Steven Universe in previous years, in 2015, the studio executives told her that while she had a choice to make Ruby and Sapphire LGBTQ, some countries might pull back the series and the series itself could be cancelled.

On January 15, 2015, EJ Randell and Sue Randell were introduced as Jeff's mothers in the Clarence episode "Jeff Wins." In April 2015, a gay fairytale romance story, titled Prince Harry, aimed at younger audiences, was released. In the film, Prince Henry's parents invite all the eligible princes and princesses in the land so that Henry may choose one of them to marry. However, Prince Henry is already in love with his servant Thomas. Class issues rather than sexuality prove discriminating factors.

In 2016, Sugar came out as bisexual at San Diego Comic-Con and started to speak more openly on LGBTQ issues in Steven Universe and in the industry. She later said she had to come out because it was hard for her to "try and make heteronormative art." As a result, Sugar began advocating more for her characters, and first in 2017, Steven Universe won a GLAAD Media Award.

On August 1, 2017, OK K.O.! Let's Be Heroes began airing on Cartoon Network. Series creator Ian Jones-Quartey hinted at LGBTQ characters in an interview with Den of Geek published a day before the first episode aired, saying those watching it would "be delighted" by the LGBTQ representation in the series. There were LGBTQ characters in the main cast, among supporting characters and other recurring characters. For instance, the series featured two married couples: Lord Boxman and Professor Venomous, two villains, and Joff and Nick Army, two recurring heroes. The series was noted as portraying Boxman and Venomous romantically. They were not the only LGBTQ characters. Enid, a bisexual ninja and witch, and Red Action, a lesbian, were recognized by GLAAD as a couple, and kissed in the episode "Red Action 3: Grudgement Day". It was later confirmed that Yellow was possibly Red's ex-girlfriend.

In April 2018, two lesbian characters were confirmed in Craig of the Creek. In July 2018, Summer Camp Island introduced the two fathers of Ghost the Boy. The show also featured Puddle, a non-binary alien who uses they/them pronouns and their husband, Alien King, is the king of their planet.

In July 2018, Steven Universe episode, "Reunited" aired, becoming the "first gay proposal and wedding episode," and making "kids' animation history." The episode was praised for its execution, focus on the show's core themes, and queer representation. At the 2019 Creative Arts Emmy Awards, the episode was nominated for Outstanding Short-Format Animated Program.

On September 3, 2018, the season finale of Adventure Time, "Come Along With Me" aired on Cartoon Network, which confirmed Marcy and Bonnie as a couple, as they kissed in the episode. After the episode aired, some would argue that the on-screen confirmation of the same-sex romance showed that the "cartoon landscape has changed during Adventure Time's run," Some said the episode invited viewers to re-examine the past interactions of Bonnie and Marcy "through a queer lens" while impacting the animation world and TV industry. One reviewer, Mey Rude of .them, argued that without the show, there would be no Steven Universe, Clarence, Summer Camp Island, or Rick and Morty. Others praised the kiss between Marceline and Bubblegum, calling it "historic" and saying the finale was "more than queerbaiting" but rather a  "true romantic relationship."

In December 2018, a writer for Transformers: Cyberverse confirmed that a character named Acid Storm was genderqueer, saying they like to switch between male and female genders.

On April 27, 2019, the creator of The Amazing World of Gumball, Ben Bocquelet, said that Gumball "loves whoever he loves" in response to someone asking about the character's sexuality, implying that Gumball could either be bisexual or pansexual.

In July 2019, Young Justice introduced Wyynde, a gay character and Harper Row, a bisexual friend to Violet Harper and Fred Bugg.

On August 8, 2019, Jones-Quartey confirmed that OK K.O.! Let's Be Heroes had been cancelled by Cartoon Network, but would still air a final episode.

On September 6, 2019, the series finale, "Thank You for Watching the Show," of OK K.O.! Let's Be Heroes aired. It included a same-sex wedding between Joff and Army in the series finale "Thank You for Watching the Show" on September 6, 2019. Before the episode aired, Jones-Quartey confirmed Army and Joff as a canon gay couple and Gregg, a minor character, as non-binary, while Bobo was implied to be agender.

On the day of the series finale, Jones-Quartey confirmed Venomous as bisexual, but not non-binary, and said that  The Hue Troop, which Red was once part of, are all LGBTQ characters. The same day, Toby Jones, one of the supervising directors, confirmed Radicles "Rad" as genderfluid and called Enid and Red a "committed couple," with Jones-Quartey saying the relationship developed "very naturally." Some reviewers noted that Enid has possible romantic feelings toward Elodie.

Following the airing of the series finale, Jones-Quartey confirmed that Boxman was pansexual,  In October 2020, Ian Jones-Quartey confirmed that Professor Venomous and Lord Boxman of OK K.O.! Let's Be Heroes were married at the end of the series. He further stated that Red Action and Enid, in the same episode, "run a dojo together and kiss." The series was later recognized by Philadelphia Gay News and Out for its LGBTQ representation.

In December 2019, the limited epilogue series, Steven Universe Future began airing on Cartoon Network. The series included a one-time non-binary character named Shep (voiced by Indya Moore), the romantic interest of Sadie. The same month, Craig of the Creek confirmed they had a non-binary character named Angel.

Nickelodeon
On December 19, 2014, The Legend of Korra, a Nickelodeon show, aired their season finale, which showed Korra and Asami holding hands, showing they are in a relationship. As such, the show became one of the first western children's animation series to not only feature major LGBT characters, but also a lead LGBT character. One of the show creators, Michael Dante DiMartino confirmed Korra and Asami as having romantic feeling together, while the other show creator Bryan Konietzko said he was "very proud' of the ending, and that while he loved "how their relationship arc took its time," there was a limit to how much they could go with in the show. He also hoped that the show would move LGBTQ representation forward.

In the aftermath of series finale, which aired on Nickelodeon and Nick.com, there were debates about "queer representation in children's media." Some noted that while the relationship between two bisexual characters, Korra and Asami, was built up during the course of the series, the words "I love you" were never uttered, nor did the characters kiss. Similarly, Kya of The Legend of Korra was shown to be lesbian in the graphic novel following the series finale. Some reviewers described the episode "a romantic ending for...a canon couple made up of two bisexual women": Korra and Asami, but criticized that while a kiss was implied, it was "not allowed on screen by Nickelodeon."

On June 2, 2015, gay drag queen RuPaul guest starred as a snail in the episode "Costume Boxing!" of the series Bubble Guppies.

Nickelodeon's Hey Arnold! was confirmed to have two gay characters in July 2016. Eugene Horowitz and Mr. Robert Simmons were confirmed as gay by the show's creator Craig Bartlett, but not explicitly stated in the series.

On July 20, 2016, an interracial gay couple, Howard and Harold McBride, was introduced in an episode of The Loud House titled "Overnight Success." This couple was described by Michael Rubiner, executive producer of the show from 2018 to present, as only natural. Even so, the latter was censored by a South African broadcaster, DStv, despite the fact that it was met with "overwhelmingly positive reaction." They would be the first pair of married male characters to be depicted on a Nickelodeon series.

In the September 2017 Loud House episode "L is for Love," Luna Loud would be revealed as a bisexual girl who sent a love letter to a girl named Sam Sharp. Later on, Sam seems to feel similarly about Luna  and appears to reciprocate Luna's feelings in that episode and others, with Lori describing them as beginning to date in the episode "Racing Hearts," though neither character calls their excursion a date throughout the episode.

In October 2017 it was reported that a kiss between two female characters, Zarya Moonwolf and Kitty Boon, on the Nickelodeon show, Mysticons, was in danger of being cut. Despite this, the show showed the "development of a female-female romance," between Zarya, a main character, and her childhood friend, Kitty, known as "MoonBoon," culminating in romantic moments.

In August 2018, the  show's creator, Sean Jara, confirmed the two as a couple, noting that only one version of the episode was created and that the show's creative team fought for a kiss, but lost even though they managed "to keep the integrity of the love story." In later tweets, Jara said there is a "beautiful love story" between Zarya and Kitty in the show, referring to the interactions between the two characters in episode 37 ("The Princess and the Pirate"), stated the importance of showing "love between LGBTQ characters on TV," and said that the kiss was cut from the episode because of "systemic homophobia" in the kids television industry, crediting Rebecca Sugar for making strides. He then opined on the continual battle for more LGBTQ representation, cited an Entertainment Weekly article about LGBTQ representation in cartoons, and praised the battles for more representation which go on behind the scenes. He said this saying that Nick did not pick up the show for more than 40 episodes and, once again, confirmed Kitty and Zarya as a lesbian couple. In September, Jara said that they treated the Kitty and Zarya relationship "like all the other relationships in the show." He added that while he was nervous and aware of possible roadblocks, Matt Ferguson, the show's director, supported it, as did his writing team, with Ferguson adding that pushback came from not from people who were "evil" but rather from those who were "trying to do the best job at their particular job."

Abbey White of Insider reported that when the show's studio changed the series to center on four teenage girls, Jara brought in more women and queer writers to the show's writing team, who were "responsible for building out an arc between lesbian characters Zarya Moonwolf and Kitty Boon," which fans gave the shipping name of "MoonBoon." Jara recalled that he sent in the script for a kiss of the two character to the show's studios, and Nickeleodon, and fellow producers working on the show, but the moment never aired, despite support from Nickeledon, because a partner was concerned that the storyline was not "age-appropriate" for young viewers. As a result, despite Jara's attempts to convince the partner, the creative team had to scrap the kiss, and almost had to unravel the whole love story between Zarya and Kitty, but Jara fought for that to be included. In the article, Nelvana confirmed in a statement that the decision to remove the kiss made during production of the show's Season Two, and said that they are committed to having "creative storytelling with diversity and inclusion at the forefront" when it comes to BIPOC and LGBTQ representation.

In September 2019, the animated miniseries Middle School Moguls began airing on Nickelodeon. One of the characters was a non-binary fashion mogul named Wren. One character, Yuna, in the main cast, had two moms, who appeared in two episodes as secondary characters who give Yuna moral support, giving her the inspiration to finish her fashion designs.

Disney
On February 15, 2016, series finale of Gravity Falls, aired on the Disney Channel featured Sheriff Blubs and Deputy Durland confirmed as a gay couple.

In March 2017, Star vs. the Forces of Evil would make headlines with an episode entitled "Just Friends." The episode featured characters attending a concert and later concert-goers starting to kiss, "including several same-sex couples...in the background."

In August 2017, Doc McStuffins, featured a lesbian (and interracial) married couple, Thea and Edie, voiced by lesbian actresses Wanda Sykes and Portia de Rossi respectively. Some, like Jeremy Blacklow, GLAAD director of entertainment media, would argue that this episode would be a turning point for executives who fears boycotts from conservative groups like The Family Research Council and One Million Moms, calling the episode a "major win for both Disney and preschool series," showing that LGBTQ characters could appears in shows aimed at younger viewers without retaliation or crisis.Star Wars Resistance, which aired from October 2018 to January 2020 on the Disney Channel and Disney XD, featured LGBTQ characters. In this animation, Orka and Flix run the Office of Acquisitions on the Colossus, with Orka doing the negotiations. Justin Ridge, an executive producer for the show, said that it's safe to call them a couple, adding "they're absolutely a gay couple and we're proud of that" on the Coffee With Kenobi podcast. Some said that they didn't see themselves in the show because they were only confirmed outside of the show's universe by the show's creators.

In December 2018, the creator of Big City Greens, Chris Houghton, confirmed, on Tumblr, that Alexander and Terry are a couple, although protagonist Cricket Green does not seem to realize that they are gay throughout the series. Alexander is loud, rather effeminate and bossy, and Terry is silent and an introvert. They both appear to be hanging out with each other in a few episodes, such as "Gridlocked", "Fill Bill", "Barry Cuda", and "Trailer Trouble". Alexander is voiced by John Early, a gay actor.

In April 2019, it was shown that Jackie Lynn Thomas, a character in Star vs. the Forces of Evil, is bisexual. This was because she dated a male character but ended that relationship due to his feelings for the protagonist. Then, in the April 2019 episode "Britta's Tacos", it is revealed that Jackie has a relationship with a French girl named Chloé. As such, it is clear that Jackie is bisexual.

My Little Pony franchise

In May 2013, the official European Spanish My Little Pony: Friendship is Magic Facebook page referred to Big McIntosh as Cheerilee's querido. In June 2013, in the My Little Pony: Equestria Girls film, Curly Winds and Wiz Kid would be shown as a gay romantic couple. Other media of the franchise shows them sitting together, including in the film My Little Pony Equestria Girls: Rainbow Rocks, the song "Coinky-Dink World" in My Little Pony Equestria Girls: Summertime Shorts, the episode "Queen of Clubs" of My Little Pony: Equestria Girls, My Little Pony Equestria Girls: Rollercoaster of Friendship and My Little Pony Equestria Girls: Sunset's Backstage Pass. In the Rainbow Rocks DVD/Blu-ray audio commentary, Michael Vogel refers to "Curly Winds" and "Wiz Kid" as a "couple" during their shot singing together in Welcome to the Show.

In March 2016, Lauren Faust confirmed that one character in season 1 of My Little Pony: Friendship is Magic was trans, but never specified which character she was talking about. Screenshot of tweet she is responding to is here.

Also in April 2019, King Sombra in My Little Pony: Friendship is Magic was confirmed by series writers Michael Vogel and Josh Haber as bisexual The same year, Aunt Holiday and Auntie Lofty were shown as aunts to the young pegasus Scootaloo and are her guardians while Scootaloo's parents are away. The pair were identified as a lesbian couple by one of the show runners, Michael Vogel. According to Vogel, he and writers Nicole Dubac and Josh Haber agreed to establish the two in their first appearance in the book as a lesbian couple, though without explicitly stating as such, so that they could establish this within the shown itself. Vogel stated they felt they could show that what elements make up a family is only determined by love, and not traditional roles. Additionally, epilogue of the final episode hints that Rainbow Dash and Apple Jack are a domestic couple. Animation writer John Haber, producer Michael Vogel, and storyboarder Jim Miller said that it is up to fans interpret whether they are in a relationship, but hinted at it as a possibility.

In May 2019, storyboarder, and show director of My Little Pony: Equestria Girls, Katrina Hadley, expressed her support for "Appledash". A few months later, a storyboarder and co-director of the original My Little Pony series, Jim Miller, confirmed that Marble Pie found a special "somepony" for herself.

In late 2019, a lesbian relationship in My Little Pony: Friendship is Magic on Discovery Family was confirmed. Lyra Heartstrings and Sweetie Drops, who propose to one another in the season 9 episode "The Big Mac Question," and in the series finale, "The Last Problem," they are shown as married in a newspaper clipping.

Voltron and The Dragon PrinceVoltron: Legendary Defender aired on Netflix from June 2016 to December 2018. It featured three gay characters, Shrio and Adam, who broke up, with Adam dying several years later, but at the end of eighth and final season, Shiro is married to Curtis, a background character introduced in Season 8. The series was fraught with criticism for its LGBTQ representation, especially for killing off a gay character, with some saying the show was following a stereotype known as "burying that gay", leading showrunner Joaquim Dos Santos to apologize to fans. The fact that Shiro's partner was killed off in the same episode he was introduced "played into negative tropes and didn't sit well with fans."

In November 2019, the official Twitter account for The Dragon Prince revealed that Kazi was genderqueer and used they/them pronouns. Later, it was revealed that Runaan, the leader of the assassins and father figure to Rayla, was married to a male elf named Ethari.

Other all-ages animations

In the 2010 update of Scooby-Doo, Mystery Incorporated, which aired from 2010 to 2013, Velma, who was long read as gay, was officially written as a lesbian. Specifically, the producer of this series, Tony Cervone, confirmed that Velma is a lesbian while James Gunn, who wrote the screenplays of Scooby-Doo and Scooby-Doo 2: Monsters Unleashed, she was "explicitly gay." In this series, Velma has feelings for Marcie "Hot Dog Water" Fleach.

In a February 2010 episode of 6teen, a Canadian animated series, a guest character, Connie, asks their co-worker if she is trying to "find out" if she is gay. The show's co-creator, Jennifer Pertsch, told Insider when it came to representation in the show, they did what they "could get away with." Connie, a drummer in Wyatt's band, also who appears in a few other episodes: "Snow Job," "Selling Out To The Burger Man," later going with Jean to the Sadie Hawkins Day Dance. Jean is the third gay character to be featured on the show, she's the only one who's outright stated to be so, with the others being a possibly gay cowboy and Kevin as gay.

During BotCon 2011, in June 2011, the writers suggested that Knock Out in Transformers: Prime, a series on The Hub Network, is gay, though they also argued that Cybertronians likely don't have designations for sexual orientation the way humans do, and the Decepticons follow a "don't ask, don't tell" policy.

In June 2015, Hey Duggee, a UK animated series, had gay characters. Mr. John Crab and his mute husband Nigel Crab first appeared in the series 1 episode "The Sandcastle Badge".

In June 2017, Amazon Video premiered the animated video series Danger & Eggs, for what would become its only season. Even so, it would break barriers with the amount of representation. The show, co-created by a trans woman named Shadi Petosky, was filled with LGBTQ+ characters: a femme "brown-skinned energetic creative" named Reina, a genderqueer character named Milo, who uses they/them pronouns Furthermore, the voice of Milo, an agender model named Tyler Ford said their character is an "accurate representation" of them. The show's final episode introduced the dads of Corporate Raider Jim, and a new trans teen, Zadie, who sings about acceptance and helps the series protagonists understand the meaning of a chosen family. Unfortunately, by February 2018, the future of Danger and Eggs was uncertain. As Petosky put it at the time, she felt that the show was in limbo, with the loss of the crew, without "much concern or enthusiasm" about the show, saying it "just slipped through the cracks." She lamented that the show's fate is up the new executive team on the show and predicted the show would probably be cancelled as a result. In later years, Milo was highlighted as one of the only non-binary characters of color in animation.

In September 2018, John Hart of Gays With Kids, wrote about how 16 Hudson featured episodes with a character who had two dads.

In May 2019, PBS aired an Arthur episode titled “Mr. Ratburn and the Special Someone”, the Season 22 premiere, which featured Mr. Ratburn and Patrick marrying each other. He and his husband are the first LGBT characters in the series. Later, the episode was banned by some Alabama broadcasters. However, some criticized Ratburn, describing him as a background gay character."

In September 2019, My Little Pony: Equestria Girls began airing on YouTube. The show featured Sunset Shimmer, who has an ex-boyfriend, Flash Sentry, and crushes on Twilight Sparkle in the human world. Katrina Hadley, storyboarder, assistant director on My Little Pony Equestria Girls: Legend of Everfree and co-director of Equestria Girls specials, said it was "pretty obvious" Apart from Shimmer, Rarity and Applejack were said to be on the edge of becoming a couple. Hadley described their conflict as a "little like a lovers quarrel" and that internally the staff were shipping both characters, opening the door for a romantic reading of both characters.

Animated films
In 2010, the Illumination film Despicable Me was released. The film, and its sequels and spin-offs, feature the Minions, a race of small yellow-skinned creatures that work for the franchise's main character, Felonious Gru. In 2015, during an interview promoting the Minions' spin-off film, director and Minions voice actor Pierre Coffin confirmed all Minions to be male; the first film features two Minions kissing each other in a crowd scene, while two Minions flirt with each other in the sequel whereas one falls in love with human female Lucy, and the third film shows two Minions sharing a bed, indicating the species as a whole to be non-heteronormative. 

On May 3, 2012, Strange Frame, a romantic science fiction comedy-drama film, was released at Sci-Fi-London. In the film, set in the distant future, two women fall in love, but when Parker is taken away and enslaved by greedy businessmen, the Naia must save her, in this film which has been praised for its "hybrid of cut out and CGI animation" and has been described as possibly "the trippiest lesbian film ever made." Others called it the world's first animated lesbian-themed sci-fi film.

In August 2012, ParaNorman, a stop-motion animated dark fantasy comedy horror film, would be released in the United States. In the film, Courtney has a crush on Mitch Downe and invites him to watch a horror movie. She, however, discovers that he is gay and already in a relationship when he says, "You know, you're gonna love my boyfriend. He's like a total chick flick nut!" Co-director Chris Butler said that the character's sexual orientation was explicitly connected with the film's message: "If we're saying to anyone that watches this movie don't judge other people, then we've got to have the strength of our convictions."

On June 13, 2014, How to Train Your Dragon 2 was released in U.S. theaters. In the film, the voice actor for Gobber the Belch, Craig Ferguson ad-libbed a line in the second film in which he mentions that he never got married for an undisclosed reason. Ferguson and director Dean DeBlois have confirmed that this was in reference to the character's homosexuality. His sexuality was also hinted at again in the third film, in 2019, where he seems to fall for Eret.

On January 20, 2016, Batman: Bad Blood, a direct-to-video animated superhero film, was release digitally on iTunes and the Google Play Store. The lesbian superheroine, Batwoman, has a major role in this film. This is the first time she is openly shown as a lesbian woman in animated media. She is seen flirting with the lesbian detective Renee Montoya. Kate's father, Colonel Jacob Kane, is supportive of her sexual orientation.

On March 4, 2016, Zootopia, computer-animated buddy cop film, was released in the United States. In the film, Bucky Oryx-Antlerson and Pronk Oryx-Antlerson are an anthropomorphic kudu and oryx, respectively, who are loud and argumentative neighbors to main protagonist Judy Hopps. Given their differing species and sharing a hyphenated surname, viewers and fans speculated the pair were a married same-sex couple. This was later confirmed by co-director Jared Bush.

In August 2016, Sausage Party, an adult computer-animated comedy film, began showing in theaters in the United States. In the film, Teresa Del Taco is a Mexican lesbian taco who has a crush on Brenda, a hot dog bun from an eight-bun package of Glamour Buns who is Frank's love interest. Additionally, though enemies at first and implied to be Muslim, Kareem Abdul Lavash and Sammy Bagel Jr. eventually form a relationship.

In the September 2016 film, Storks, there are various lesbian couples shown. Near the end of the film, the storks deliver babies to straight, lesbian and gay couples, and single parents.

In July 2017, In a Heartbeat, a computer-animated short film produced by Ringling College of Art and Design and funded through Kickstarter, was released. The short film concerns a closeted gay boy, Sherwin who has a crush on another boy named Jonathan and his heart desires to be with him. Since its launch, the film has received numerous awards and has been shown at numerous LGBT events and film festivals. It got shortlisted at the Academy Awards for Best Animated Short Film, but did not get a nomination. The short was also included in The animation Showcase 2017 world touring screening that premiered it in London 25 July 2017 in Soho House.

In September 2017, a Canadian animated short, Soggy Flakes, featured two LGBTQ characters. One is Dr. Bird Berry, a trans woman, the mascot of Berry Delicious before she got a Ph.D. and transitioned. Another is Captain Kale, the mascot of Kale Flakes, and was in a relationship with Dr. Bird Berry before Bird Berry transitioned.

Also releasing in December 2017 was a 13 minute animated short titled Manivald. The titular protagonist of this short is a gay fox in his early 30s who is trying to find love. Another character, Toomas, is a wolf repairman and the object of Manivald and his mother's affections. However, it is revealed that he is married to a woman named Vivi and they have two kids with a third one on the way. This is expanded upon in the 2019 follow-up film Toomas Beneath the Valley of the Wild Wolves in which he becomes a gigolo after getting fired from his job but he hides it from his family.

On March 27, 2018, Suicide Squad: Hell to Pay, an adult animated superhero film, was released digitally. In the film, Scandal Savage and Knockout, prominent characters in the film, are displayed as lovers. Knockout first appears alongside Scandal breaking through Professor Pyg's lair and taking him hostage to their apartment. She is later seen in the hospital in critical condition after being shot, but with a concerned Scandal by her side. At one point in the film, Savage and Knockout share a kiss, while Knockout is shown fully nude at one point.

On September 30, 2018, Marvel Rising: Secret Warriors aired on the Disney Channel and Disney XD. The team included America Chavez, the first Latina, and lesbian, superhero in the Marvel Cinematic Universe, who had already appeared in animated shorts titled "Marvel Rising: Initiation". GLAAD expressed hope that the film would allow Chavez to be represented accurately, and "serve as an introduction of America and further queer characters to the Marvel Cinematic Universe." The film was later described as "a superhero tale with diversity oozing out of every animated frame," with note of Chavez having two mothers.

In August 2019, Nickelodeon released Rocko's Modern Life: Static Cling, a television film and sequel to their 1993 series Rocko's Modern Life through Netflix. The producers worked with GLAAD to endure that the  transgender character, in the form of cartoonist frog Rachel Bighead (known as Ralph Bighead in the original series) as well as a plotline involving her coming out to her parents, Ed and Bev Bighead, was respectful to the LGBTQ+ community and fit within the show itself.  The same month, the voice actor for Dana Dufresne, Maddie Taylor, revealed that her Loud House character had transitioned from a man to a trans woman, like herself, and said that the character would return in another episode within season 4. However, Season 4 concluded on July 23, 2020 and no such episode or even appearance of Dana was shown.

On September 2, 2019, Steven Universe: The Movie premiered on Cartoon Network. It included Ruby, Sapphire, and Pearl, lesbian characters from the original Steven Universe series. In the film, after Spinel rides in to Earth on a planet-destroying weapons and attacks Steven Universe and the other three Crystal Gems (Pearl, Garnet, and Amethyst), causing all them to be "rejuvenated" into their original forms. As Pearl and Amethyst are left with a sort of amnesia, Garnet splits into her component pieces: Ruby and Sapphire. While Steven works with his friends to bring back the memories of Pearl and Amethyst, he also recreates the moment which brought Ruby and Sapphire together into Garnet, and is successful in restoring Garnet first to "cotton candy" form, then to her original self. Garnet also sings a song about love, titled "Isn't It Love?". Furthermore, in the process of getting Pearl's memories back, 
Amethyst and Steven work together to get her memories back, including Amethyst transforming into Rose, who she calls Pearl's "love of her life." While this is not successful, Steven later succeeds by fusing with his father, into Steg, causing Pearl to come back to her original self.

On September 25, 2019, Shannon Amen, a Canadian animated short, premiered at the Ottawa International Animation Festival. The film is a tribute to Shannon Jamieson, a friend and creative collaborator of the filmmaker who committed suicide after being unable to accept her sexuality.

In October 2019, Wonder Woman: Bloodlines, direct-to-video animated superhero film was released. In the film, Etta Candy appears as an openly lesbian African-American, voiced by Adrienne C. Moore.

Timeline of key events
 September 26, 2011: The Adventure Time episode "What Was Missing" shows on Cartoon Network. The episode begins hints at romantic subtext between Princess Bubblegum and Marceline the Vampire Queen.
 November 4, 2013: Steven Universe airs its first episode on Cartoon Network.
 December 19, 2014: The series finale of The Legend of Korra airs, confirming Korra and Asami as a romantic couple.
 April 3, 2016: Waylon Smithers, a character in The Simpsons, came out, officially, as gay.
 July 20, 2016: Howard and Harold McBride appear in The Loud House, becoming the first pair of married male characters to be depicted on a Nickelodeon series.
 July 22, 2016: In the Season 3 finale of Bojack Horseman, Todd Chavez comes out as asexual.
 June 30, 2017: The series Danger & Eggs is released on Amazon Video. It features various LGBTQ characters.
 September 3, 2018: In the series finale of Adventure Time, Bubblegum and Marceline are confirmed as a couple, as they kiss during the episode, and begin leaving together.
 January 14, 2019: Family Guy commits to phasing out jokes about the LGBTQ community.
 February 9, 2019: Val/entina Romanyszyn reveals they were genderfluid in the fourth episode of gen:LOCK.
 October 28, 2019: The pilot episode of Hazbin Hotel premieres on YouTube, featuring various LGBTQ characters. 
 November 25, 2019: Pilot episode of Helluva Boss, set in the same universe as Hazbin Hotel'' was released on YouTube.

See also
 LGBT children's television programming
 List of animated series with LGBTQ characters
 History of homosexuality in American film
 History of anime
 Media portrayals of bisexuality
 Media portrayal of lesbianism
 List of LGBT-related films by year
 Cross-dressing in film and television
 List of animated series with crossdressing characters
 List of anime by release date (1946–1959)

Notes

References

Citations

Sources
 
 
 
  See the overview page here.
 
 
 
 
 
 
 
 

2010s animated television series
Animated television series
LGBT portrayals in mass media
LGBT characters in animation